Axtell is an English surname. Notable people with this surname include the following:

Charles Axtell (1859–1932), American sport shooter, who competed in the 1908 Summer Olympics
Daniel Axtell (1622–1660), captain of the Parliamentary Guard at the trial of King Charles I
Frances Cleveland Axtell (1866-1953), one of the first female legislators in the United States of America
George C. Axtell (1920–2011), Lieutenant General of the United States Marine Corps.
James Axtell (born 1941), professor of history at the College of William and Mary in Williamsburg, Virginia
James Wickliffe Axtell (1852–1909), newspaper man and prominent member of the Cumberland Presbyterian Church
Samuel Beach Axtell (1819–1891), controversial Chief Justice of the New Mexico Territorial Supreme Court

English-language surnames